Iván García Cortina (born 20 November 1995) is a Spanish cyclist, who currently rides for UCI WorldTeam .

Career
He was named in the startlist for the 2017 Vuelta a España. García Cortina won the 2017 Red Hook Criterium Milan fixed gear criterium race. In July 2019, he was named in the startlist for the 2019 Tour de France.

Major results

2012
 1st  Road race, National Junior Road Championships
2015
 5th Memoriał Henryka Łasaka
 10th Overall Tour de Bretagne
2016
 1st Stage 4 Course de la Solidarité Olympique
 4th Overall Istrian Spring Trophy
1st  Young rider classification 
 6th GP Izola
 7th Road race, UCI Under-23 Road World Championships
 8th Ronde van Vlaanderen U23
 8th Poreč Trophy
 10th Overall Le Triptyque des Monts et Châteaux
 10th Paris–Roubaix Espoirs
2017
 8th Road race, UEC European Road Championships
2018
 4th London–Surrey Classic
2019
 1st Stage 5 Tour of California
 3rd Grand Prix Cycliste de Montréal
 7th Overall BinckBank Tour
 7th Gran Premio Bruno Beghelli
2020
 1st Stage 3 Paris–Nice
 4th Road race, National Road Championships
 8th Road race, UEC European Road Championships
 10th Bretagne Classic
2021 
 6th Eschborn–Frankfurt
2022
 1st Gran Piemonte
 4th Trofeo Alcúdia–Port d'Alcúdia
 5th Grand Prix Cycliste de Québec
 5th Coppa Bernocchi
 8th Gent–Wevelgem
2023
 4th Trofeo Palma

Grand Tour general classification results timeline

References

External links

1995 births
Living people
Spanish male cyclists
Sportspeople from Gijón
Cyclists from Asturias